Scheveningen  is one of the eight districts of The Hague, Netherlands, as well as a subdistrict (wijk) of that city. Scheveningen is a modern seaside resort with a long, sandy beach, an esplanade, a pier, and a lighthouse. The beach is popular for water sports such as windsurfing and kiteboarding. The harbour is used for both fishing and tourism.

History 

The earliest reference to the name Sceveninghe goes back to around 1280. The first inhabitants may have been Anglo-Saxons. Other historians favour a Scandinavian origin. Fishing was the main source of food and income.

The Battle of Scheveningen was fought between English and Dutch fleets off the coast of the village on 10 August 1653. Thousands of people gathered on the shore to watch. Montagu's flagship picked up the English king at Scheveningen in order to accomplish the Restoration.

A road to neighbouring The Hague was constructed in 1663 (current name: Scheveningseweg).

In 1470, a heavy storm destroyed the church and half the houses. The village was again hit by storms in 1570, 1775, 1825, 1860, 1881, and 1894. After this last storm, the villagers decided to build a harbour. Until then, the fishing boats had had a flat bottom (bomschuiten), and were pulled up the beach. By around 1870, over 150 of these boats were in use. Once the harbour had been constructed in 1904, more modern ships replaced the bomschuiten.

In 1818, Jacob Pronk constructed a wooden building on a dune near the sea, from where people could bathe from four separate rooms. It marked the start of Scheveningen as a bathing resort. Since then, Scheveningen has attracted numerous tourists from all over Europe, notably from Germany.

The hotel Kurhaus was opened in 1886. The village attracted a number of Dutch artists over the centuries, who painted the bomschuiten drawn up on the beach, or fishermen at work in the North Sea. Notable painters who recorded the village include Adriaen van de Velde, Simon de Vlieger, and Hendrik Willem Mesdag, whose large panorama, 14 m high and 120 m wide, preserves the view of Scheveningen in 1881.

The International Skating Union was founded in Scheveningen in 1892.

Anecdotal evidence exists of the name Scheveningen being used as a shibboleth during World War II to identify German spies: they would pronounce the initial "Sch" as one consonant (the voiceless palato-alveolar fricative, pronounced approximately like "Sh"), rather than the native Dutch sequence of the voiceless alveolar sibilant followed by the voiceless uvular fricative, "Skh", as in "Genghis Khan".

Contrary to popular belief, Scheveningen was never an independent municipality, but it has its own coat of arms, officially recognised by The Hague local council (proposal 136 of 23 March 1984); even in the Middle Ages, it was part of the same administrative region as The Hague; the region had a special status within the county of Holland because of the presence of the Count of Holland.

Nevertheless, Scheveningen always had a strong identity of its own. For instance, it had its own football club, playing in the highest Dutch division (its name was "Scheveningen Holland Sport"). In the course of the second half of the former century, this club was forced to merge with ADO Den Haag.

From 21 April 1960, the pirate radio station Radio Veronica broadcast its programmes from an anchorage in the North Sea about four miles off the Scheveningen coast, originally calling itself Vrije Radio Omroep Nederland (VRON); Free Radio Station [of the] Netherlands. It was joined by Radio Noordzee Internationaal  in 1970 and the relaunched Radio Caroline in late 1972. When the Netherlands ratified the Treaty of Strasbourg on 1 September 1974, Veronica applied for legal status and became the VOO, Caroline moved anchorage to the English coast, and RNI closed down completely. Memorable episodes during this period included the stranding of Radio Veronica's ship, the Norderney, which lost its anchor in a storm and ran aground on Scheveningen beach on 2 April 1973, and a firebomb attack on RNI's ship, the Mebo II, on 15 May 1971.

Since the 1970s the population of the original Scheveningen changed as the fishing industry declined and some artists and professionals moved in. Most of the fisherman, captains and trawler owners houses were demolished. Some still remain and have been protected by the authorities including some of the original 'hofjes' which in this area are enclosed areas with small row houses on each side and are not accessible to cars such as the Hofje van de Lange.

Slobodan Milošević, the 3rd president of Serbia and Montenegro was found dead in his prison cell on 11 March 2006 while he was being held in the UN war crimes tribunal's detention center in Scheveningen.

Culture
In Scheveningen, a small number of predominantly elderly women are still wearing local Scheveningen costume.  It is to be expected that this will soon be a thing of the past.

The local dialect, the Scheveningen dialect, is hardly spoken by young people anymore.  Because of the closedness of the original village community, Scheveningen has many equal surnames. This led to the introduction of nicknames in local parlance in order to distinguish families better. For example, certain members from the Pronk family were known as 'the horse man', 'Piet the mouse', 'Born without a tooth' or 'Gerrit de sermon'. If you were a Pronk, a Scheveninger automatically asked 'who are you from?' to which the person addressed reacted with, for example, 'from the horse man'. Some common 'typical Scheveningen' family names are, for example, Bal, Dijkhuizen, Groen, Korving, Den Heijer, Knoester, De Niet, Plugge, Pronk, Rog, Spaans, Taal, Toet, Vrolijk, Zuurmond and Van der Zwan. Through the opening up of the fishing village from the beginning of the 20th century, this phenomenon has gradually become obsolete.

Events and attractions 

Annual events include:
Winter swim on New Year's Day, locally known as Nieuwjaarsduik (New Year's dive)
Flags Day in spring when the first new herring of the year is auctioned
Fireworks in summer: once a week and several days during a festival week
Vreugdevuur from second christmas day to new year's eve: a large competition between two subdivisions of Scheveningen (Duindorp and Scheveningen dorp) to build the largest tower made out of pallets and then lighting it on fire to signal the beginning of the year, Duindorp currently holds the world record.
A visit to Scheveningen can include:
The Muzee Museum (official museum of Scheveningen)
The pier
Bungy jumping 
Ziplining 
The miniature city Madurodam
The sculptures at sea museum Beelden aan Zee
The Panorama Mesdag
The four different beaches of Scheveningen
Our Lady of Lourdes (RC) Silent Center, in a designated national landmark complex, housing a replica of the Lourdes Grotto in Massabielle (France). The chapel, located at Berkenbosch Blokstraat 9a, is open daily from 9am to 6pm.
Night life centres on Pathé Scheveningen movie theatre, and the sea-front boulevard with its bars, restaurants, gambling halls, and other entertainment.

Museums
 Atlantikwall Museum Scheveningen
 Bunker Museum Den Haag
 Beelden aan Zee
 Muzee Scheveningen
 Museumschip Hr. Ms. Mercuur, former Aggressive-class minesweeper

Lighthouse 

The light beam flashes at alternate intervals of 2.5 and 7.5 seconds.

Subdistricts
The subdistricts of district Scheveningen are:
Scheveningen
Duinoord
Statenkwartier
Belgisch Park
Oostduinen
Maduroplein
Duindorp
Van Stolkpark
Westbroekpark

Noted natives
 Machiel de Graaf (b. 1969), politician
 Romy Haag (b. 1951), dancer, singer and actress
 Theo Jansen (b. 1948), artist
 Cornelis Jol (1597-1641), admiral and privateer
 Dick Jol (b. 1956), football referee
 Martin Jol (b. 1956), football manager and player
 Wim Kan (1911–1983), cabaret artist
 Bert Pronk (1950–2005), cyclist
 Jan Pronk (b. 1940), politician and diplomat
 Hans Heinrich Thyssen-Bornemisza (1921-2001), industrialist
 Tim Smit (b.1954), businessman, composer, environmentalist and archaeologist
 Piet Spaans (b.1933), a poet who speaks Schevenings dialect

References

External links 

Tourist Information Scheveningen
Tourist Information Scheveningen (English)
Two Beach Streaming Livecams
Boulevard webcam
Boulevard weather station

Seaside resorts in the Netherlands
Port cities and towns of the North Sea
Boroughs of The Hague
Populated places in South Holland